is a Japanese rock band formed in Tokyo by guitarists Pirako Kurenai and Kageo in July 1999. In 2002, Toshihiko Isogai joined on drums and the band added Doronco on bass a few months later. Also joined was Tail. Since then membership has revolved.

The band's music is characterized by free improvisation through twin-guitar explorations with vocals. They have made many live shows with Keiji Haino, having been the first one a 3 hour session jam in 2004. The group have toured the US and Europe many times and released various CDs, some on the Holy Mountain label. Their new CD is being produced by Michael Gibbons of Bardo Pond.

September 25, 2011 "You Tears" was released by "P.S.F RECORDS".

Discography
  (Self-Released, 2003)
  (Japanoise, 2005)
  (Holy Mountain, 2006)
 Akatsuki: The Sky Grayed and the Dawn Came Behind the Fog (Self-Released, 2006)
 I Throw a Stone Into the Endless Depths (Sloow, 2007)
 The Light of Dark Night (aRCHIVE, 2007)
 Writhing Underground Flowers (The Lotus Sound, 2007)
 The Shining Star (Important, 2007)
 Prayer for Chibi (Holy Mountain, 2008)
 Mystic Atmosphere (Cut Hands, 2008)
  (Blossoming Noise, 2008)
  (There, 2009)
 Secret Entrance (Scumbag Relations, 2010)
 Your Tears (P.S.F., 2011)
 Bonsai no Ie (8mm, 2011)
 Black Flowers of the Forest in the Cosmos (Essence, 2013) (with Numinous Eye)
  (P.S.F., 2015)
 Moonlight (Sour, 2018)
 The Lost Trees of Paradise (Important, 2019)

References

External links
 
 
 
 
 

Japanese psychedelic rock music groups
P.S.F. Records artists